Rejoso is the name of a district (kecamatan) in Pasuruan Regency, East Java, Indonesia.  The following is a list of the villages in the district:
 
 Arjosari
 Jarangan
 Karangpandan
 Kawisrejo
 Kedungbako
 Kemantrenrejo
 Ketegan
 Manikrejo
 Pandanrejo
 Patuguran
 Rejoso Kidul
 Rejoso Lor
 Sadengrejo
 Sambirejo
 Segoro Puro
 Toyaning

References

Pasuruan Regency
Districts of East Java